The judo competitions at the 2013 Mediterranean Games in Mersin took place between 21 June and 23 June at the Mersin University Hall.

Athletes competed in 14 weight categories.

Medal summary

Men's events

Women's events

Medal table
Key:

References

External links
 

 
2013
Mediterranean Games
Mediterranean Games
Sports at the 2013 Mediterranean Games
Mediterranean Games